Hotakainen is a surname. Notable people with the surname include:

Kari Hotakainen (born 1957), Finnish writer
Valtteri Hotakainen (born 1990), Finnish ice hockey player

Fictional characters:
Tuuri, Lalli and Onni Hotakainen, main characters in the webcomic Stand Still Stay Silent